The Yana is a river in Magadan Oblast, Russian Far East. Tauisk village is located at the mouth of the river.

The basin of the river includes tundra zones which provide a habitat for the brown bear, bird species such as the long-toed stint and the common snipe, as well as amphibians such as the Siberian salamander.

Course 
The shorter Left Yana has its source in the Kolyma Highlands.

The Yana flows roughly southeastwards across mountainous terrain. In its last stretch it enters a floodplain among wetlands just east of the Taui River (Kava) and west of the Arman. Finally it flows into the Amakhton Bay, part of the Taui Bay of the Sea of Okhotsk. 

See also
List of rivers of Russia

References

External links
Floating Tours Down The Rivers of Magadan Region
Kolyma - Modern Guidebook to Magadan Oblast

Rivers of Magadan Oblast
Drainage basins of the Sea of Okhotsk